A list of horror films released in 1960.

List

See also
 Lists of horror films

References

Citations

Bibliography

 
 
 
 
 
 
 
 

Lists of horror films by year